Erik Richter (born 1966) is an American screenwriter and, with Michael Ouweleen, the co-creator of Harvey Birdman, Attorney at Law.

Richter also wrote for Space Ghost Coast to Coast.
Richter created the Marvel Mash-Ups shorts on Disney XD.

References

External links 
 

1966 births
Living people
American male screenwriters